Qian Jianan is a member of Shanghai Writers Association. Her works won the thirty-fourth session of Taiwan's "Times Literary Award" short story Jury Award and were twice nominated for literary prize Lin Yu Tang final review. Her translation of the novel "Pink Hotel" ([English] Anna Stothard, Sichuan Literature and Art Publishing House) appears more commonly in the works of "Shanghai Literature" "Fu Rong" "Mengya" "Li" and other publications.

Biography 
Qian Jianan was born in Shanghai in late 1980s。She graduated from Department of Chinese Studies of Fudan University. She is currently doing an MFA degree in Iowa Writers' Workshop

Books 
 Release 《人只会老，不会死》。 (Rén zhǐ huì lǎo, bù huì sǐ)

References

External links 

1980s births
Living people
Chinese women novelists
People's Republic of China novelists
Writers from Shanghai
Year of birth missing (living people)